Leah Julia Wilkinson (born 3 December 1986) is a Welsh international field hockey player who plays as a defender for Wales and Great Britain.

She was born in Burton-on-Trent, England, and plays club hockey in the Women's England Hockey League Premier Division for Surbiton.

Wilkinson has also played for Holcombe and Reading.

She represented Wales at the 2010 Commonwealth Games, 2014 Commonwealth Games and 2018 Commonwealth Games.

In 2004 she made her international debut for Wales against Ireland. She took over the captaincy of her country in 2018 and on 1 June 2019 she became not only the most capped hockey player, but most capped Welsh sportsperson.

Wilkinson made her debut for Great Britain on 1 October 2019 v India and won a bronze medal at the 2020 Summer Olympics in Tokyo.

References

External links
 
 
 
 
 
 
 

1986 births
Living people
Holcombe Hockey Club players
Welsh female field hockey players
British female field hockey players
Women's England Hockey League players
Field hockey players at the 2010 Commonwealth Games
Field hockey players at the 2014 Commonwealth Games
Field hockey players at the 2018 Commonwealth Games
Commonwealth Games competitors for Wales
Field hockey players at the 2020 Summer Olympics
Olympic field hockey players of Great Britain
Olympic bronze medallists for Great Britain
Medalists at the 2020 Summer Olympics
Olympic medalists in field hockey
Welsh LGBT sportspeople

LGBT field hockey players